The 36th Army Corps was an Army corps in the Imperial Russian Army.

Part of
2nd Army: 1915
1st Army: 1915
2nd Army: 1915 - 1916
10th Army: 1916
9th Army: 1916 - 1917
4th Army: 1917

Corps of the Russian Empire